Marudur is a panchayat village located near karamadai in the Coimbatore District, of Tamil Nadu in India.

Demographics
As of 2011 India census Marudur in Coimbatore District, Tamil Nadu, had a population of 9,491. Average literacy rate of the people in this panchayat is 64.86% which is higher than the national average.

References

Villages in Coimbatore district